The Slavyanka is a river in Leningrad Oblast of Russia. It is a left tributary of the Neva.

It then continues north, and flows into the Neva in the Rybatskoye area of Saint Petersburg. The Slavyanka is a typical slow-moving lowland river.

References

External links 
 Savyolova, E.A.: Slavyanka and its tributaries (Russian)

Rivers of Leningrad Oblast
Rivers of Saint Petersburg
Cultural heritage monuments of federal significance in Saint Petersburg